January 2017

See also

References 

 01
killings by law enforcement officers